Tsimguda is a rural locality (a selo) in Kolobsky Selsoviet, Tlyaratinsky District, Republic of Dagestan, Russia. The population was 147 as of 2010.

Geography 
Tsimguda is located 33 km southeast of Tlyarata (the district's administrative centre) by road. Gagar and Kolob are the nearest rural localities.

References 

Rural localities in Tlyaratinsky District